The CMC Veryca (中華菱利) or CMC Varica (中華百利/中華威利) is a cabover kei truck and microvan built and sold in Taiwan by the Taiwanese automaker China Motor Corporation (CMC) (中華汽車) since 1985, with its predecessor entering production in 1978.

The CMC Varica started off as long wheelbase iterations of the fourth generation Mitsubishi Minicab and were also available with a variety of bodywork. The Taiwanese version (built by CMC, China Motor Corporation) was called the CMC Varica (中華百利/中華威利, Zhōnghuá bēi Lì/Zhōnghuá Wēi Lì). Unrestricted by the kei class regulations, the engines used soon grew larger than the ones used in Japan.

In 2013, CMC launched its first independent product, the CMC Leadca, redesigned all of its products, and started to brand them with the CMC badge instead of the Mitsubishi badge. The Delica and Veryca received their CMC facelift in 2013 while the CMC Zinger was not facelifted until 2015.



First generation (1978-1984)

The first generation CMC Minicab debuted in 1978, and was a locally manufactured third generation Mitsubishi Minicab. It was the first commercial vehicle product of China Motor Corporation. The Chinese name was pronounced Baili (百利), and was offered in van and pickup bodystyles.

Second generation (1985-2007)

Pre-facelift (1985-1988)

The second generation CMC minivan debuted in 1985 and was the first to carry the Varica nameplate. The Chinese name remained Baili (百利), and it was a rebadged version of the fourth generation Mitsubishi Minicab.

First facelift (1989-1997)

Based on the same structure as the second generation Varica, the third generation Varica was redesigned by Yulon and debuted in 1988 for the 1989 model year. The Chinese name was changed to be Weili (威利). The second generation Varica received a facelift in 1993, updating the headlamps while canceling the grilles. The Varica's nose was also extended somewhat.

From November 2004 India's Premier has been building a diesel powered version of the Veryca. Its body panels are shipped from Taiwan, and a Hindustan-built 2-liter Isuzu diesel unit is fitted. It has  and is mated to a four-speed manual gearbox, while the car offers from five to nine seats. A multitude of other versions have since been developed, and as of 2009 the engine has been replaced by a 1.5 liter IDI diesel (with or without turbo) or by the CNG-powered 1.8-liter 4ZB1 (both still manufactured by Hindustan). The Sigma was discontinued around 2012, but the pickup version (called the Premier Roadstar) remains available with both engine options as of 2019.

Second facelift (1998-2007)

The fourth generation Varica debuted in 1998, and was essentially an extended facelift of the third generation Varica. A 1.2-litre engine replaced the smaller 1100, and the facelift also included a longer, more rounded nose. The Chinese name remained "Weili" (威利). Still offered in both van and pickup bodystyles, the fourth generation CMC Varica was sold until 2007.

Veryca (2000-Present)

In 2000, the succeeding product of the second generation Verica debuted. It was based on the sixth generation Mitsubishi Minicab Town Box Wide version and was renamed to Veryca with the Chinese name changed to Lingli (菱利). The design was restyled by China Motor Corporation's own research and design center. The redesign extended the rear overhang and also changed the front and rear down road graphics.

In 2001, a version called the CMC Veryca Magic was unveiled. The CMC Veryca Magic features wider wheel arches, a 1.6 liter engine, and was aiming towards the passenger vehicle market instead of the usual commercial vehicle market for the CMC Veryca.

In 2013, the CMC Veryca received a facelift featuring a restyled front fascia and a rear end from the 2010 Soueast C1 Xiwang.

In 2018, the CMC Veryca received another facelift, changing the front end and rear end designs while adding A180 for van models and A190 for pickup models.

Soueast Veryca and Soueast C1 Xiwang
The Soueast Veryca was a result of the partnership between China Motor Corporation and Soueast Motors. The Soueast Veryca was essentially a rebadged CMC Veryca for the Chinese market. A facelift was revealed later, and was renamed to Soueast C1 Xiwang. The C1 made its debut during the 2010 Guangzhou Auto Show and commenced production in 2011. Soueast C1 Xiwang engine options include a Soueast 1.3-liter engine producing 82 hp and 102 nm of torque and a Mitsubishi-sourced 1.3-liter engine producing 92 hp and 114 nm of torque. Both engines are mated to a 5-speed manual gear box. Prices ranges from 36,800 yuan to 46,800 yuan.

References

Cars introduced in 1978
1980s cars
1990s cars
2000s cars
All-wheel-drive vehicles
Kei cars
Kei trucks
Rear-wheel-drive vehicles
Microvans
Cab over vehicles